Zabolotny is a rural locality (a settlement) in Gorodetskoye Rural Settlement, Kichmengsko-Gorodetsky District, Vologda Oblast, Russia. The population was 12 as of 2002.

Geography 
The distance to Kichmengsky Gorodok is 27 km. Yemelyanov Dor is the nearest rural locality.

References 

Rural localities in Kichmengsko-Gorodetsky District